Justin Moore (born June 13, 1983) is an American soccer player who last played for the Atlanta Blackhawks of the USL Premier Development League.

Moore played college soccer at Clemson University from 2002-05.  He appeared in 78 games over four seasons, scoring 4 goals and assisting on 16. He also played for one season with Augusta Fireball in the USL Premier Development League.

He was drafted in the second round, 15th overall, of the 2006 MLS SuperDraft by FC Dallas.  After signing a senior contract for the 2006 season, the club offered Moore a developmental contract for the 2007 season which he declined, and he signed for the Atlanta Silverbacks prior to the 2007 season.

References

External links
 Atlanta Silverbacks Player Profile

1983 births
Living people
Atlanta Blackhawks players
Atlanta Silverbacks players
American soccer players
Clemson Tigers men's soccer players
Augusta FireBall players
FC Dallas players
Major League Soccer players
USL First Division players
USL League Two players
FC Dallas draft picks
Association football defenders